Lorraine Kelly  (born 30 November 1959) is a Scottish journalist and television presenter. She has presented various television shows for ITV, including  Good Morning Britain (1988–1992), GMTV (1993–2010), This Morning (2003–2005, 2016), Daybreak (2012–2014), The Sun Military Awards (2016–present), STV Children's Appeal (2016–present), and her eponymous programme Lorraine (2010–present).

Kelly was appointed Officer of the Order of the British Empire (OBE) in the 2012 New Year Honours for services to charity and was promoted to Commander of the Order of the British Empire (CBE) in the 2020 Birthday Honours for services to broadcasting, journalism and charity.

Early life
Kelly was born in the Gorbals area of Glasgow. She has Irish ancestry. Her father, John, worked as a television repairman. She spent the first few years of her life in Glasgow before the family moved to East Kilbride where she attended Claremont High School. She turned down a university place to study English and Russian in favour of a job on the East Kilbride News, her local newspaper, and then joined BBC Scotland as a researcher in 1983. She moved to TV-am as an on-screen reporter covering Scottish news in 1984.

Career

1984–1993: TV-am
In early October 1984, Kelly joined TV-am as Scotland Correspondent.  On the back of her coverage of the Pan Am Flight 103 disaster in Lockerbie, in July 1989, Kelly presented TV-am's Summer Sunday programme with chief reporter Geoff Meade.

Throughout the rest of 1989, Kelly provided cover for the presenters on the main weekday programme. On 31 January 1990, she became a main presenter of Good Morning Britain alongside Mike Morris.

1993–2010: GMTV, Talk Radio
In January 1993, Kelly helped launch GMTV by presenting a range of programmes. Her first job was presenting the new Top of the Morning. In March, when Fiona Armstrong walked out of the main GMTV show, Kelly moved to the main breakfast show with Eamonn Holmes. In June 1994, Kelly went on maternity leave, but shortly afterwards she was sacked from the main presenting roles, she returned in November 1994 to do a mother and baby slot. This led to her becoming the presenter of Nine O'Clock Live. The show proved so popular that it was moved to the earlier 08:35 slot, retitled Lorraine Live.

Kelly also had a stint in radio, with her own daily program broadcast on air by then new British phenomenon of Talk Radio (precursor of TalkSport) around 1997-99.

In Autumn 2000, as GMTV rebranded to GMTV Today, Kelly's show changed its name to LK Today. As part of the later rebrand that took place in 2009, the show again changed its title to GMTV with Lorraine, to coincide with GMTV Today changing back to GMTV. Lorraine moved for the first time into the main GMTV studio, instead of Kelly having her own part of the studio to host from. In April 2010, to make GMTVs programming more consistent, GMTV with Lorraine began airing all year round, instead of breaking during school holidays, with guest presenters.

According to the Sunday Mirror, in 2007, Kelly was prevented from appearing in an advertising campaign for Asda as GMTV managing director Clive Crouch felt that such a move would create more bad publicity for GMTV, which had recently been fined £2 million by broadcasting regulator Ofcom for its misuse of premium-rate phone lines.

On 9 July 2010, as well as the announcement that GMTV had been axed to make way for Daybreak, it was also revealed that Kelly's new programme Lorraine would replace GMTV with Lorraine. On 15 July 2010, Kelly presented her last show before leaving.

2010–present: Lorraine, Daybreak and other projects
On 6 September 2010, GMTV ended with ITV Breakfast taking over. Lorraine launched with a brand new look, alongside Daybreak.

In 2011, Kelly presented the ITV series Children's Hospital, and was a guest presenter on the BBC Two series Never Mind the Buzzcocks in series 25. She provides voice-over and narration on the CBeebies show Raa Raa the Noisy Lion.

On 4 May 2012, it was confirmed that Kelly would take over from Christine Bleakley as presenter on Lorraine's sister programme Daybreak. She debuted on 3 September 2012. She co-hosted the programme with Aled Jones from Monday to Thursday, with Kate Garraway co-hosting on Fridays.

In February 2014, Kelly announced that she would leave Daybreak to focus on Lorraine which she began hosting five days a week from 28 April 2014. Daybreak was replaced by Good Morning Britain in April 2014. Lorraine would occasionally report for GMB whenever her show wasn't aired.

In 2014, Kelly made a cameo appearance in an episode of Birds of a Feather. On 19 September 2014, Kelly reported from Dundee on Good Morning Britain on the Scottish independence result. On 13 April 2016, Kelly guest presented an episode of This Morning with Rylan Clark-Neal.

Kelly presented a four-part series for Channel 5 called Penguin A&E with Lorraine Kelly. The series began airing on 10 May 2016. In 2018, Kelly co-presented Wedding Day Winners with Rob Beckett. The show aired on Saturday nights on BBC One.
In May 2019, she made a cameo in Coronation Street. During the COVID-19 pandemic, she hosted her programme in the Good Morning Britain studio. “Good Morning Britain with Lorraine” had a more news-focused style to it, yet still featured interviews with celebrities, Hollywood updates from Ross King, and medical advice on the pandemic with Dr Hilary Jones. She returned to the Lorraine studio on 13 July.

STV
Kelly hosted the annual Glenfiddich Spirit of Scotland Awards in 2005 and 2006 for STV.

Since 2011, Kelly has hosted STV's Children's Appeal annually with Sean Batty, she also hosts STV Appeal Stories on the channel and her 2016 Show Lorraine & Friends.

Kelly hosted the 2014 and 2015 Hogmanay Party which aired on New Year's Eve just before midnight and after Midnight. Hogmanay Party didn't continue in 2016 instead Kelly hosted Lorraine Kelly's Hogmanay.

In 2019 she presented the gameshow The Cash Machine. Lorraine made two appearances of the STV Glasgow talk show The Riverside Show and one appearance on the late-night talk show The Late Show with Ewen Cameron which runs across all STV channels.

Other television work
During 1994/1995 Kelly also presented Carlton magazine programme After 5. She appeared on Lily Savage's Blankety Blank in 2001.

Kelly presented Liquid News, the spin-off Liquid Eurovision and became the national spokeswoman for the United Kingdom during the collation of votes at the Eurovision Song Contest, in both 2003 and 2004, replacing the long-serving Colin Berry.

She was parodied by Dawn French in the TV sitcom Absolutely Fabulous as a stereotypical daytime TV news reporter for series 1 in 1992, this role was reprised for the film in 2016.

She has made several appearances on Have I Got News for You including appearances as guest presenter.

From 2004, Kelly co-presented This Morning with Phillip Schofield, on Mondays and Fridays, to allow Fern Britton to spend more time with her family, but she left in March 2006.

Kelly guest hosted an episode of The Friday Night Project on Channel 4. She also guest hosted The New Paul O'Grady Show  and returned three other times from 2006 to 2008, owing to sheer popularity.

Kelly also hosted the annual Glenfiddich Spirit of Scotland Awards in 2005 and 2006 for STV.

In 2006, Kelly filmed an ITV documentary programme Secrets Revealed – DNA Stories, made by STV Productions, and broadcast on Sky Real Lives. A second series was shown on the channel in 2008.

In 2010, Kelly filmed a six-part documentary series Lorraine Kelly's Big Fat Challenge shown on Bio. The series featured Kelly and a team of experts putting 'Britain's fattest family', the Chawner family through their paces to lose weight and transform their lives. Daughter Emma Chawner is best known for her unsuccessful appearances on The X Factor.

In 2010, in conjunction with the Missing People charity, Sky and STV produced a new documentary series hosted by Kelly, about missing mothers. This series followed the success of Sky's previous successful missing person series Missing Children: Lorraine Kelly Investigates.

Kelly has also made acting appearances in the Scottish sitcom Still Game and the soap opera River City.

In 2021, Kelly interviewed Gurdeep Pandher.

Writing
Kelly writes weekly columns for The Sun and The Sunday Post. She was announced as the first Agony Aunt for the Royal Air Force's fortnightly RAF News on 7 October 2009.

Charity work
Kelly is a celebrity patron of Worldwide Cancer Research.

Kelly is also a patron of the Human Rights advocacy, information and advice charity POhWER. About being a patron, Kelly commented: 'I am proud to be a Patron of POhWER, a charity which helps people to find their voice, make their case, get the care and support they need and see wrongs put right'.

Kelly is also a patron of the British charity Help for Heroes.

Kelly is an Honorary Patron of The Courtyard, Herefordshire's Centre for the Arts.

In 2011, Kelly was among the celebrities to take part in the BT Red Nose Desert Trek which took place in the Kaisut Desert for Comic Relief and raised £1,375,037.

She has been an ambassador and presenter for STV Children's Appeal since its creation in 2011. Kelly also became an ambassador for the charity Sightsavers in 2011.

Awards and honours
In April 1991, Kelly was awarded the TRIC Diamond Jubilee Award for New Talent of the Year. In 2004, she was elected as the first female rector of the University of Dundee, being formally installed to office on 28 April 2004. She held this position until 2007. On 20 June 2008 she was awarded an honorary Doctor of Laws from the university for her services to charity.
On 28 June 2018 She was awarded the Honorary degree of Doctor of Arts from Edinburgh Napier University.

Kelly was appointed Officer of the Order of the British Empire (OBE) in the 2012 New Year Honours for services to charity and the armed forces and was promoted to Commander of the Order of the British Empire (CBE) in the 2020 Birthday Honours for services to broadcasting, journalism and charity.

On 16 November 2014, Kelly received a special Scottish BAFTA award honouring her 30-year television career.

Kelly has been described by Attitude as "one of Britain's cult gay icons". In 2015, she was given the "Honourary Gay Award" at the 2015 Attitude Awards for her support for the LGBT community.

Since June 2009 she has been an Honorary Colonel in the Black Watch battalion Army Cadet Force. Since November 2019, she has been National Honorary Colonel of the Army Cadet Force.

Commonwealth honours

Scholastic

 Chancellor, visitor, governor, rector and fellowships

Honorary degrees

Honorary military appointments

Personal life
Between 1993 and 2005, Kelly lived at Cookham Dean in Berkshire, on the Thames west of London, with her husband, Steve Smith, a television cameraman, who she married in 1992. Kelly previously lived in Broughty Ferry, Dundee until December 2017 as she found commuting back and forth was not working. Kelly and her husband then decided to sell their Broughty Ferry home to be closer to Lorraine's work, and so they could spend more time together. Kelly has described herself as an 'adopted Dundonian' and despite moving away, she considers Dundee to be a place that she will always call home.

They have one daughter, Rosie, born in 1994, who teamed up with Lorraine on The Cube in December 2021, playing for MS Therapy Centre which supports Steve’s sister. Kelly’s second pregnancy ended in miscarriage (2000). Kelly was born to a Catholic mother and a Protestant father, but she is an outspoken critic of Catholic schools in Scotland and has called for an end to them saying they were a cause of trouble in society, and prolonged the "scandal of sectarianism".

She has been a fan of the Scottish football team Dundee United since 1987 after being taken to a game by her now-husband.

In 2018, Kelly spoke of her experiences with the menopause, and encouraged other women to speak about it.

Filmography

Television

Guest appearances
 Cluedo (1992)
 Surprise Surprise (1993–1995)
 The Mrs. Merton Show (1995)
 Shooting Stars (1997)
 Timmy Towers (1997)
 An Audience with the Spice Girls (1997)
 Harry Hill (1998)
 Late Lunch (1999)
 It's Only TV ... But I Like It (1999)
 Lily Savage's Blankety Blank (2001)
 The Weakest Link: Celebrity Special (2001)
 Who Wants to Be a Millionaire? (2003)
 The Xtra Factor (2006)
 Alan Carr's Celebrity Ding Dong (2008)
 The Marriage Ref (2011)
 Real Housewives of New York (2012)
 Piers Morgan's Life Stories (2013)
 Birds of a Feather (2014)
 Tipping Point: Lucky Stars (2014)
 The Jonathan Ross Show (2014)
 Mel and Sue (2015)
 Harry Hill's Alien Fun Capsule (2017)
 Murder in Successville (2017)
 Catchphrase: Celebrity Special (2017)
 The Cube (with daughter Rosie) (2021)

Film

Bibliography
 Lorraine Kelly's Nutrition Made Easy (Virgin Books, due January 2009)
 Lorraine Kelly's Junk-Free Children's Eating Plan (Virgin Books, 2007)
 Lorraine Kelly's Baby and Toddler Eating Plan (Virgin Books, 2002/2004/2006)
 Lorraine Kelly's Scotland (released 13 March 2014)

References

External links
 Lorraine Kelly official website
 
 The Lorraine Kelly Appreciation Society
 Flickr The Lorraine Kelly Appreciation Society
  Blog The Lorraine Kelly Appreciation Society
 

1959 births
British women television journalists
GMTV presenters and reporters
ITV Breakfast presenters and reporters
Scottish LGBT rights activists
Living people
Commanders of the Order of the British Empire
People associated with Dundee
People educated at Claremont High School (East Kilbride)
People from East Kilbride
People from Gorbals
Rectors of the University of Dundee
Scottish columnists
Scottish people of Irish descent
Scottish television journalists
Scottish women television presenters
Scottish women columnists